Jagdish Ishwarbhai Patel is an Indian politician. He was elected to the Gujarat Legislative Assembly from Amraiwadi in the 2019 by election as a member of the Bharatiya Janata Party. By-elections happen due to Hasmukhbhai Patel elected to Parliament.

References

Living people
Bharatiya Janata Party politicians from Gujarat
People from Ahmedabad
Gujarat MLAs 2017–2022
Year of birth missing (living people)